La Merced (Spanish for: The Mercy) may refer to:

Argentina
 La Merced, Catamarca, Paclín Department
 La Merced, Salta, Cerrillos Department

Colombia
La Merced, Caldas

Guatemala
La Merced Church, in Antigua Guatemala

Mexico
La Merced barrio, Mexico City
La Merced Cloister, Mexico City

Peru
La Merced, Junín
La Merced, Aija, Ancash Region
La Merced District, Aija, Ancash Region
La Merced District, Churcampa, Huancavelica Region
La Merced Hill, Madre de Dios, Madre de Dios Region
La Merced, Lima, a neighborhood in the district of Ate in Lima

United States
 La Merced (schooner) a ship listed on the U.S. National Register of Historic Places; its derelict hull is in Anacortes, Washington.

See also
La Merced (Mexico City Metrobús), a BRT station in Mexico City
Merced (disambiguation)
De la Merced (disambiguation)